Zoe, Duncan, Jack and Jane is an American teen sitcom created by Daniel and Sue Paige, starring Selma Blair, David Moscow, Michael Rosenbaum, and Azura Skye that premiered on The WB network from January 17, 1999 and ended on June 11, 2000. During development, the show was initially known as Zoe Bean and was later retitled Zoe... during its second season. The series aired a total of 26 episodes over its two seasons.

Characters
The series centered on four eccentric high school friends in New York City. The foursome attended (fictional) Fielding-Mellish Prep, which gets its name from Woody Allen's character in the movie Bananas.

Zoe Bean (Selma Blair): A coy, boy-crazy daydreamer.
Duncan Milch (David Moscow): An anxious oddball. A Woody Allen type.
Jack Cooper (Michael Rosenbaum): Handsome, but egotistical and selfish. 
Jane Cooper (Azura Skye): Jack's twin sister. Sarcastic and cynical. (Although playing twins, Skye was nine years younger than Rosenbaum in real life.)

The show also starred Mary Page Keller as Zoe's single mother Iris during the first season. Scott Foley, fresh from Dawson's Creek, appeared in the pilot with the intention of having him star in the series as Zoe's love interest. But once the pilot finally got picked up, Foley had already moved on to Felicity.

Episodes

Series overview

Season 1 (1999)
During the first season, the show centered on the four teenagers as high school students. Jeremy Renner originally played Jack in the original pilot episode but was replaced by Michael Rosenbaum. The first season included guest stars such as Scott Foley as a college boy Zoe had a crush on, Sara Rue as a wheelchair-using bully, Will Friedle as a charming stoner who dated Zoe, and Jacinda Barrett as a girl who liked both Duncan and Jack.

The first season theme song was "Charmed" by My Friend Steve.

Season 2 (2000)
When the show returned for a second season, it had been heavily retooled. The friendship between the four friends remained intact, but now they were adult college students. Gone was Keller as Zoe's mom, while Omar Gooding joined the cast as the foursome's friend Doug Anderson. The title had also been shortened to simply Zoe... (pronounced on-air as Zoe Dot Dot Dot) out of fear that the former title was turning off potential viewers.

After the series was cancelled, Michael Rosenbaum expressed disappointment with the fact that the network had cut his character's name out of the title for the second season.

References

External links
  
 

1990s American college television series
1990s American high school television series
1990s American teen sitcoms
1999 American television series debuts
2000s American college television series
2000s American high school television series
2000s American teen sitcoms
2000 American television series endings
English-language television shows
Fictional quartets
Television series about twins
Television series by ABC Studios
Television shows set in New York City
The WB original programming